Milton High School is a high school in Milton, northwest Fulton County, Georgia, United States.

History
Milton High School opened in 1921 in Alpharetta, Georgia, providing grades one to eleven for all of Milton County. In the 1950s, an elementary school was built, with Milton High School then providing only grades eight through twelve. In the 1980s the school became Fulton County's first comprehensive high school. The school was named a School of Excellence in the 1997–98 school year by the Georgia Department of Education, and an outstanding high school the following year by the U.S. News & World Report. A new campus, using the academy model, was opened in Milton in 2005, starting with freshmen only the first year. Milton High School no longer offers grade eight.

Activities
Milton High School competes in Class AAAAAAA, Region 5 of the Georgia High School Association.

State sports championships
Baseball:1955, 2004, 2013
Basketball (boys'): 2010, 2012, 2021
Cheerleading (coed): 2017
Cross Country (boys'): 2017
Football: 2018
Golf (boys'): 2012
Golf (girls'): 2012
Gymnastics: 1990, 1991, 1998, 1999
Lacrosse (boys'): 2010, 2012
Lacrosse (girls'): 2005, 2006, 2007, 2008, 2010, 2011, 2012, 2013, 2014, 2015, 2017, 2018, 2019, 2021
Soccer (girls'): 2012
Tennis (boys'): 1985 (tied), 2003
Tennis (girls'): 1980 (three-way tie), 1983 (tie), 1985 (three-way tie)
Wrestling: 1978

State activity championships
Debate: 2001, 2002, 2009
One Act Play: 2011, 2012, 2013, 2014, 2017, 2021-22

Notable alumni
 Peyton Barber (class of 2013) – National Football League (NFL) running back 
 Dylan Cease – Major League Baseball (MLB) pitcher
 John Dewberry – Georgia Tech quarterback and Atlanta real estate developer
 Kyle Farnsworth (class of 1994) – Major League Baseball player 
 Dexter Fowler (class of 2004) – Major League Baseball player
McKenzie Kurtz – Broadway actress
 Carl Lawson (class of 2013) – New York Jets outside linebacker
 Bryan Nesbitt (class of 1987) – automobile designer 
 Daniel Pope (class of 1994) – former punter in the National Football League; played for Kansas City Chiefs, Cincinnati Bengals, New York Jets, with his longest NFL punt being 64 yards 
 Danyelle Sargent (class of 1995) – Fox News sports reporter
 Bobby Scales (class of 1995) – Major League Baseball player
 Shannon Scott (class of 2011) – Ohio State / Toronto Raptors basketball
 Michael Waldron (class of 2006) - screenwriter and producer known for his work on Rick and Morty, Loki (TV series), Heels (TV series), and Doctor Strange in the Multiverse of Madness

References

Public high schools in Georgia (U.S. state)
Educational institutions established in 1921
Schools in Fulton County, Georgia
1921 establishments in Georgia (U.S. state)